Austria participated in the Eurovision Song Contest 2002 with the song "Say a Word" written by Robert Pfluger and Alexander Kahr. The song was performed by Manuel Ortega. The Austrian broadcaster Österreichischer Rundfunk (ORF) returned to the Eurovision Song Contest after a one-year absence following their relegation from 2001 as one of the bottom six countries in the 2000 contest. ORF organised the national final song://null.zwei in order to select the Austrian entry for the 2002 contest in Tallinn, Estonia. Ten songs competed in a televised show where an internet jury panel and a public vote selected "Say a Word" performed by Manuel Ortega as the winner.

Austria competed in the Eurovision Song Contest which took place on 25 May 2002. Performing during the show in position 3, Austria placed eighteenth out of the 24 participating countries, scoring 26 points.

Background

The Austrian national broadcaster, Österreichischer Rundfunk (ORF), broadcasts the event within Austria and organises the selection process for the nation's entry. ORF confirmed their intentions to participate at the 2002 Eurovision Song Contest on 1 June 2001. From 1995 to 2000, ORF has held an internal selection to choose the artist and song to represent Austria at the contest. Along with their participation confirmation, the broadcaster also announced that the Austrian entry for the 2002 contest would be selected through a national final. This method had last been used by ORF in 1994.

Before Eurovision

song://null.zwei 
song://null.zwei (song://zero.two) was the national final that selected Austria's entry for the Eurovision Song Contest 2002. The competition took place on 1 March 2002 at the ORF Center in Vienna, hosted by Andi Knoll and broadcast on ORF eins. The first part of the national final was watched by 814,000 viewers in Austria with a market share of 31%, while the second part was watched by 913,000 viewers in Austria with a market share of 42%.

Format 
Ten songs competed in the competition where the winner was selected by public voting and an internet jury panel consisting of 2,002 members selected via an online quiz. The jury results created an overall ranking from which points from 1 (lowest) to 5 (highest) were distributed to the top five entries. Viewers were able to vote via telephone or SMS, each of them which also created an overall ranking and assigned scores from 1 to 5. After the combination of all scores, the entry with the highest number of points was selected as the winner.

Competing entries 
Six artists were nominated by record companies, while an additional four acts was chosen through an open submission. For the open submission, ORF invited all interested artists to submit their songs to the broadcaster between 28 August 2001 and 30 November 2001. The broadcaster received over 700 submissions at the close of the deadline, which were reviewed by a team of music professionals. The ten artists selected to compete in the national final were revealed on 28 January 2002 at an ORF press conference that was hosted by Andi Knoll.

Final 
The televised final took place on 1 March 2002. Ten songs competed and the combination of votes from an internet jury panel and a public vote split between telephone and SMS voting selected "Say a Word" performed by Manuel Ortega as the winner.

At Eurovision 
According to Eurovision rules, all nations with the exceptions of the bottom six countries in the 2001 contest competed in the final. On 9 November 2001, a special allocation draw was held which determined the running order and Austria was set to perform in position 3, following the entry from the United Kingdom and before the entry from Greece. Austria finished in eighteenth place with 26 points.

The show was broadcast in Austria on ORF eins with commentary by Andi Knoll and via radio on FM4 with commentary by Stermann and Grissemann. The Austrian spokesperson, who announced the Austrian votes during the final, was Dodo Roscic.

Voting 
Below is a breakdown of points awarded to Austria and awarded by Austria in the contest. The nation awarded its 12 points to the United Kingdom in the contest.

References

External links
Austrian National Final page

2002
Countries in the Eurovision Song Contest 2002
Eurovision